Buckley is a city in Pierce County, Washington, United States, founded in 1882. The population was 5,114 at the 2020 census. Buckley sits below Mount Rainier and is well known for hosting the annual Log Show.

Geography
Buckley is located at  (47.162250, -122.027744) near the communities of Enumclaw, Bonney Lake, and Wilkeson.

Climate
According to the Köppen Climate Classification system, Buckley has a warm-summer Mediterranean climate, abbreviated "Csb" on climate maps.

Demographics

2010 census
As of the census of 2010, there were 4,354 people, 1,591 households, and 1,049 families residing in the city. The racial makeup of the city was 93.0% White, 0.6% African American, 0.8% Native American, 0.8% Asian, 0.1% Pacific Islander, 1.2% from other races, and 3.4% from two or more races. Hispanic or Latino of any race were 3.1% of the population. By 2014, the city's population remained 93.0% White, and a combined 3.0% Hispanic or Latino.

There were 1,591 households, of which 33.7% had children under the age of 18 living with them, 48.6% were married couples living together, 11.5% had a female householder with no husband present, 5.8% had a male householder with no wife present, and 34.1% were non-families. 26.3% of all households were made up of individuals, and 11.6% had someone living alone who was 65 years of age or older. The average household size was 2.50 and the average family size was 3.00.

The median age in the city was 39.9 years. 22.5% of residents were under the age of 18; 8.9% were between the ages of 18 and 24; 25.4% were from 25 to 44; 30% were from 45 to 64; and 13% were 65 years of age or older. The gender makeup of the city was 50.3% male and 49.7% female. Males remained the dominant gender still in 2014 with a recorded total of 2,191 men and 2,163 women.

2000 census
As of the census of 2000, there were 4,145 people, 1,396 households, and 995 families residing in the city. The population density was 1,072.7 people per square mile (414.6/km2). There were 1,472 housing units at an average density of 380.9 per square mile (147.2/km2). The racial makeup of the city was 93.78% White, 0.63% African American, 1.13% Native American, 0.77% Asian, 0.17% Pacific Islander, 0.55% from other races, and 2.97% from two or more races. Hispanic or Latino of any race were 1.81% of the population.

There were 1,396 households, out of which 38.5% had children under the age of 18 living with them, 54.2% were married couples living together, 12.3% had a female householder with no husband present, and 28.7% were non-families. 22.1% of all households were made up of individuals, and 7.2% had someone living alone who was 65 years of age or older. The average household size was 2.65 and the average family size was 3.12.

In the city, the population was spread out, with 26.4% under the age of 18, 7.4% from 18 to 24, 32.4% from 25 to 44, 24.8% from 45 to 64, and 9.0% who were 65 years of age or older. The median age was 36 years. For every 100 females, there were 102.3 males. For every 100 females age 18 and over, there were 106.9 males.

The median income for a household in the city was $49,453, and the median income for a family was $54,900. Males had a median income of $43,409 versus $29,688 for females. The per capita income for the city was $19,744. About 3.6% of families and 8.3% of the population were below the poverty line, including 6.4% of those under age 18 and 4.9% of those age 65 or over.

History

Taken from the files of the City of Buckley and Buckley Library
 1856 Decisive battle of Indian War fought at Connell's Prairie, 6 miles (10 km) west of Buckley.
 1875
 Coal discovered at Wilkeson
 Jeremiah 'Jerry' Stilley, first permanent non-Indian resident, settled West of town.
 1877 Railroad built from Tacoma to Wilkeson to transport coal.
 1882 Town named "Perkin's Prairie"
 1884 Northern Pacific built railroad spur track from Cascade Junction (between South Prairie and Buckley) to  Perkin's Prairie.  Town given name "White River Siding" by railroad men.
 1885 Town's first store erected by "Dad" Chamberlain.
 1887
 Town renamed "Buckley" for J.M. Buckley, Northern Pacific Railway district superintendent.
 First school established.
 1888 Town site platted by Alexander and Mary Wickersham.  Town booming with lumber and shingle mills springing up overnight.
 1889
 First post office established.
 District Court appointed five men as trustees of the Town of Buckley.
 First newspaper printed and published in Buckley - The Buckley Banner.
 1890
 Town incorporated by electorate.
 1890
 Buckley Lodge 75, IOOF, chartered.
 Western Star Lodge, F&AM, chartered.
 1891 Land donated for Buckley cemetery.
 1892
 May 5 Business District almost wiped out fire. Started on second story of the Buckley Lumber Store. Many brick buildings built after this fire still stand on Main Street.
 June 17 New school built at present site of White River School District building on A Street.
 First permanent church built.
 World's Fair in Chicago, Illinois - Buckley Mills sell wood, shingles, and supplies to be used at the World's Fair Exhibit Buildings
 First organized water system established.
 1893
 February 24 Fire Department in Buckley was established. Dr. JH Sheets was selected as an honorary member to act as a surgeon
 1894
 October 17 First fire dept. dance. Ladies-free Men-$0.25  Children as spectators for $0.10
 Eola Rebekah Lodge chartered.
 1895
 July 6 Discussion of entering first 4th of July parade, uniforms and plans to build station were finalized
 1897 Women's Musical & Literary Club founded.
 1898 Business district razed by fire. First high school classes held, building erected.
 1900 Mount Rainier Chapter, OES, chartered.
 1902
 Addition built on schoolhouse.
 Degree of Honor chartered.
 First library established.
 1905 First high school graduation held.

 1906 Buckley Aerie 1387, FOE, chartered.
 1907
 Gravity water system built; water stored in reservoir still in use by town.
 First general use of electricity.
 1909
 Marion Grange chartered.
 School burned to ground.
 Town established fire department to replace Columbia Hose Company, a private fire-fighting group.
 1910 New brick school built on A Street.
 1911
 White River Power Plant completed. (Headwork, flume, powerhouse.)
 Present town hall built.
 1912 Plank streets replaced by paving.
 1914 Wickersham elementary school built.
 1920 Large section of business district leveled by fire.
 1923 Vocational unit added to high school building.
 1927 FOE Auxiliary 1387 chartered.
 1928 Buckley Kiwanis Club chartered.
 1929 Town purchased pumper fire truck to replace hand-drawn equipment.
 1931 Carbon Glacier Post 1414, VFW, chartered.
 1932 Rainier State School opens.
 1937 Buckley Garden Club organized.
 1939
 Rainier School officially opened.
 Work commenced on Mud Mountain Dam on White River.
 1942 Mud Mountain Dam completed.
 1944 Buckley railroad logging ended with closure of Buckley Logging Company mill.
 1946 City limits extended to include Rainier School and farms south of town.
 1947
 Last company-operated coal mining discontinued.
 Additional construction at Rainier School.
 1948 Kindergarten class instituted.
 1949
 Additional construction at Rainier School.
 Buckley and Enumclaw school districts consolidated.
 1950 Buckley Business & Professional Women's Club chartered.
 1951 Rural Fire District No. 12 organized.
 1952
 New fire station built.
 Additional construction at Rainier School.
 Sewage disposal plant built.
 1953
 Purchase of a 1941 Packard as first aid car by fire dept. for $945
 Wickersham school annex built.
 White River School District (Buckley-Enumclaw) de-consolidated.
 1955 Buckley Planning Commission created.
 1956
 New gymnasium built at high school.
 Ida Marge Orthopedic Guild chartered.
 1957
 Town established natural gas utility.
 Buckley Junior Chamber of Commerce chartered.
 1958 New street signs erected.
 1959 Northern Pacific railroad depot torn down.
 1989 Filming of "Waiting for the Light" released 1990, Starring Shirley MacLaine and Teri Garr 
 2003 Elk Head Brewery opened its doors.
 2003 White River High School moved to a new location in a brand new facility.
 2010 White River girls varsity soccer team reached the 2A WIAA State title game. Taking Second to Sehome High School. 
 2012 White River football was played at Sheets Field for the first time since 2002.
 2015 This fall White River hosted Enumclaw at Sheets Field for the "Battle of Fullway."  White River won the last game played at Sheets against Enumclaw in 2002 but Enumclaw beat White River

In pop culture
In the 1990 film Waiting for the Light downtown Buckley and locals had cameo appearances.
In the 1996 comedy Black Sheep, Al Donnelly (Tim Matheson) and Mike Donnelly (Chris Farley) were both from Buckley.

Notable people
Blaine Larsen, country music artist
Lucille Lund, actress
Fences (band), Indie music artist

References

External links

 City of Buckley

Cities in Washington (state)
Cities in Pierce County, Washington
Cities in the Seattle metropolitan area